Carychiinae is a taxonomic subfamily of minute air-breathing land snails, terrestrial pulmonate gastropod mollusks.

Taxonomy 
Carychiinae is part of the family Ellobiidae (according to the taxonomy of the Gastropoda by Bouchet & Rocroi, 2005).

Some authors consider Carychiidae as a separate family.

Genera
Genera within the subfamily Carychiinae include:
 Carychiella Strauch, 1977
 Carychiopsina Kadolsky, 2020 †
 Carychiopsis Sandberger, 1872 †
 Carychium O. F. Müller, 1773 - type genus of the subfamily Carychiinae
 Koreozospeum Jochum, Prozorova, Sharyi-ool & Páll-Gergely, 2015 
 Ovicarychium Kadolsky, 2020 †
 Turricarychium Kadolsky, 2020 †
 Zospeum Bourguignat, 1856 
 Zuella Kadolsky, 2020 †

Ecology 
One lineage of the Ellobioidea, the Carychiidae has successfully accomplished a complete transition onto land. Extant carychiid snails inhabit aphotic and permanently wet epigean (Carychium) or subterranean (Zospeum) environments throughout their Holarctic distribution. This dramatic shift from a marine to a terrestrial habitat has occurred independently of the stylommatophoran land-snails of the Eupulmonata.

References

External links

 ITIS
 Powell A. W. B., New Zealand Mollusca, William Collins Publishers Ltd, Auckland, New Zealand 1979 

 
Taxa named by John Gwyn Jeffreys